Commandant is a military or police rank used in many Spanish, Irish and French-speaking armed forces, where it is usually equivalent to the rank of major. In South Africa for most of the second half of the 20th century, commandant was a rank equivalent to lieutenant-colonel.

Canada
 was the Canadian French term for the air force rank of squadron leader (prior to the 2014 amendment of the National Defence Act).  The rank of squadron leader itself had not been held by active duty personnel in the Canadian Forces since 1968 when it was replaced by major.

Ireland
Commandant (Comdt) is a military rank in both the Irish Army and Irish Air Corps. It is equivalent to major and squadron leader. In the Irish Naval Service, the equivalent rank is lieutenant commander.

France

Commandant is an officer-grade rank of the Military of France, specifically the French Army and the French Air and Space Force, in both of which it has NATO level OF-3: equivalent to major or lieutenant-commander. In this context, it is shortened form of the previous rank : i.e. a "captain commanding (a battalion)".

In the French Navy,  is a appointment or operational command, rather than a rank, namely, the most senior officer of a ship, e.g.  (vessel),  (frigate),  (corvette). As such, it can refer to the holders of several ranks. 

He could have a deputy (an ) and could be either a commoner or a nobleman. A major was graded as a commissar, not an officer.

 is now, however, the most senior warrant officer rank, above .

Spain

Latin America
 ("commandant") is a military officer rank used in some Latin American countries.

 can be translated into English either as "commandant" or as "commander". The rank may also be found in numerous paramilitary organizations, such as the Sandinistas.

South Africa

In South Africa, commandant was the title of the commanding officer of a commando (militia) unit, initially in the Cape Colony and later also in the Boer republics.

From 1950 to 1994 commandant was the official designation of the rank of lieutenant-colonel in the South African Army, South African Air Force, and South African Medical Service.

From 1950 to 1957, the rank insignia for a commandant ( in Afrikaans) was a crown over a five-pointed star. In 1957 the crown was replaced by a pentagonal castle device based on the floor plan of the Castle of Good Hope in Cape Town, South Africa's oldest military building. In 1994, the rank of commandant /  reverted to lieutenant colonel.

From 1968 to 1970, a related rank, chief commandant, existed in the Commando Forces [the rural part-time, territorial reserve, roughly equivalent to a National Guard or Home Guard]. This rank of chief commandant existed purely in the army and slotted in between commandant and colonel. The rank was only used by officers commanding commando groups (i.e. a small formation consisting of two or more commando units).

United Kingdom
In the United Kingdom the term commandant usually refers to an appointment, not a rank.  However, between 1922 and 1928 the rank of brigadier-general was replaced by colonel-commandant. This was not well received, and was replaced by brigadier.

Later, senior commandant and chief commandant were Auxiliary Territorial Service ranks equivalent to major and lieutenant-colonel respectively used between 1939 and May 1941, when they were replaced by senior and chief commander. The Commanding Officers of individual battalions of the Brigade of Gurkhas was designated a Commandant, rather than a commanding officer; and so with the Bermuda Militia Artillery (1895-1965). These ranks were also used in the Women's Auxiliary Air Force until December 1939, when they were replaced by squadron officer and wing officer (equating to squadron leader and wing commander) respectively.  The rank was also used for senior commanders of the Ulster Special Constabulary (B Specials).

Gallery

Army insignia

References

Military ranks
Military ranks of Ireland
Military ranks of France
Police ranks